Majda Koren (born 12 March 1960) is a Slovene children's writer and teacher. She also works with the youth programme section of Radiotelevizija Slovenija, the Slovenian national broadcaster.

Koren was born in Ljubljana in 1960. She studied at the Faculty of Education at the University of Ljubljana and works as a primary school teacher in Spodnja Šiška. She is also editor and co-author of a website for young children (www.zupca.net), which is meant for the youngest web surfers. Her book Eva in Kozel (Eva and the Goat) was included in the 2008 White Ravens Awards of the International Youth Library a list of 250 best newly published books for children.

Published works

  (Stories With Maths), 1992
  (Stories With Maths 2), 1993
  (Bigger-Smaller), 1993
  (Let's Learn Through Play), 1993
  (A A A Alphabet), 1993
  (Counting to Ten), 1993
  (Word Conundrums 1,2,3,4), 1994
  (Mici, the Little Terror), 1994
  (Mici in Town), 1996
  (This Book Doesn't Bite), 1997
  (The Ladybird on the Dusty Road), 1997
  (Terrors), 1998
  (The Butterfly in the Rain), 2002
  (Aunty Cooks), 2003
  (Župca's Diary), 2004
  (Tales of Zlatko the Rabbit), 2006
  (Eva and the Goat), 2006
  (Tia), 2007
  (More Tales of Rabbit Z), 2007
  (Lojza from Space), 2008
  (Julia is in Love Lol), 2008
  (Mici from Class 2A), 2009
  (May Forever :)), 2009
  (Bert, the Castle and Homework), 2009
  (The Bear and the Mouse 1), 2010
  (Little Miha), 2011

References

External links
 Župca site for young children where Koren is editor and co-author

Slovenian children's writers
Slovenian women children's writers
Living people
1960 births
Levstik Award laureates
University of Ljubljana alumni
Writers from Ljubljana